The Concord River is a  tributary of the Merrimack River in eastern Massachusetts in the United States. The river drains a small rural and suburban region northwest of Boston. One of the most famous small rivers in U.S. history, it was the scene of an important early battle of the American Revolutionary War and was the subject of a famous 19th-century book by Henry David Thoreau.

Description and early history
The river begins in Middlesex County, formed by the confluence of the Sudbury and Assabet rivers at Egg Rock, near the Concord town center. It flows generally north, from eastern Concord (along the northwestern edge of the Boston metropolitan area), joining the Merrimack River from the south on the eastern side of Lowell. It is a gently flowing stream with little variation in topography along most of its route. Its drainage basin stretches into Worcester County and includes 36 towns within Massachusetts.

Native Americans called it the Musketaquid or "grass-grown" river because of its sluggish waters abound in aquatic or semi-aquatic vegetation and its banks are fringed with wild grasses and sedges which stretch for miles along both sides of this placid stream.  This creates a good environment for a variety of fish, including bass, shad, and alewife (river herring), pickerel, carp, and American eel.  Native Americans wove sticks in intricate designs to trap Alewives and other migrating fish at the mouths of rivers throughout this region.	

By 1635, settlers from England began to arrive, and they gave the river its present name. On April 19, 1775, the Old North Bridge over the river in the town of Concord was famously the scene of the Battle of Concord (on the same day when the first shots of the Revolutionary War were fired at nearby Lexington). The current version of the bridge (a reproduction) is preserved by the National Park Service.

Henry David Thoreau wrote his first book, A Week on the Concord and Merrimack Rivers, in 1849 while living at nearby Walden Pond. His book recounted a seven-day boat trip on the rivers with his brother John, who had since died. Thoreau recounted his exploration of the natural beauty of the river, and his accompanying thoughts on such eternal themes as truth, poetry, travel, and friendship. Despite the growth of the suburbs in the vicinity of the river, it remains a popular canoeing destination today. The last mile of the river in Lowell is serious class 3+/4 whitewater.

Dams cause fish population to decrease
Dams were built along the Concord River to increase crop production and also to provide a source of power for operating mills.  By the 19th century, the native population of shad and alewife became extinct, because the dams prevented the mature fish from returning upstream to spawn. Alewife and other anadromous fish are migratory.  They hatch in freshwater, make their way to the sea to grow, then return as adults to freshwater to spawn, usually near where they had hatched.  This instinct is imprinted within the fish when it is born.  So, when the route upstream became blocked, the cycle was broken.  The Faulkner Dam in North Billerica is just one of many blockages that caused the alewife population to collapse on the Concord River. At this point, water was diverted north to Lowell and south to Charlestown to run the Middlesex Canal.

Effects of pollution

During the 19th century, the Concord River was near the heart of the US Industrial Revolution. Textile, paper, tanning, and mining industries all emerged during this period. Industrial wastes were dumped into the river, along with untreated sewage and other organic waste. Industrial development within the watershed peaked in the 1920s.  The early 1960s saw an increase in the number of chemical and metal firms, many supporting the electronics industry within the Boston metropolitan area. By the 1960s, the Merrimack River was considered one of the top ten most polluted waterways in America. The Concord River empties into the Merrimack River.

The passage of the Clean Water Act in 1972 signaled the beginning of US efforts to improve the quality of its waterways.  The act imposed stricter controls on point source discharges into rivers and other navigable waters.  This eventually led to the installation of three wastewater treatment plants on the banks of the Concord River: one in Concord and two in Billerica. These plants have helped to prevent subsequent damage to the river ecosystem when they were able to operate within federally mandated limits.

Pollutants such as heavy metals and PCBs remain trapped in the sediment. Throughout much of the Sudbury River and downstream into the Concord River, fish consumption is banned due to mercury-laden sediments from the Nyanza Superfund site and other sources.

Perchlorate was detected in the Concord River in August 2004.  Initially, it was believed that explosives used in road and building construction were the source of this pollutant. However, an investigation by the town of Billerica eventually determined that the source was a local company that produced surgical and medical materials.  The company was using 220 gallons per month of perchloric acid in a bleaching process, and rinse water was being discharged into the sewage system.  After the company was identified, it voluntarily shut down until ion exchange equipment could be installed in accordance with environmental guidelines.

In May 2007, Billerica was the subject of legal action and forced to pay a $250,000 penalty for discharging pollutants into the Concord River. The action was brought by the U.S. Environmental Protection Agency (EPA) and the Massachusetts Department of Environmental Protection (MassDEP) because the town of Billerica exceeded allowable effluent limits for phosphorus, fecal coliform bacteria, pH, and ammonia nitrogen. The town was also charged with failing to submit discharge monitoring reports, failing to comply with monitoring requirements, and failing to submit infiltration and inflow reporting.  According to the EPA, Billerica's discharges of phosphorus created an overabundance of nutrients, which damaged the river by stimulating excessive aquatic plant growth.

Diadromous fish recovery effort
In May 2000, the U.S. Fish and Wildlife Service, the Massachusetts Riverways Program, and volunteers from the Sudbury Valley Trustees (SVT) released 7,000 adult alewife (river herring) into the Concord River. They were transferred from the Nemasket River so that they could lay their eggs and spawn upstream. This imprinted the young alewives with the Concord as their new home river. The experiment did not succeed, as too few fish returned to the base of the first dam on the Concord River. A feasibility study published in 2016 is again exploring steps necessary for returning diadromous fish to the Concord River, and farther upstream, to the Sudbury and Assabet Rivers. Anadromous describes species that live in salt water but lay eggs in fresh water - such as alewives and shad; diadromous is a larger grouping which includes species that mature in fresh water but return to salt water to lay eggs - such as eels.

References

Further reading

External links

USGS: Concord River drainage basin
Thoreau and the Concord River
Walden.org: Thoreau's essay
Early photographs of the river
Environmental Pollution of the Concord River, a Historic American Waterway

Rivers of Massachusetts
Rivers of Middlesex County, Massachusetts
Tributaries of the Merrimack River
Wild and Scenic Rivers of the United States